The Marine Technology Society (MTS) is a professional society that serves the international community of approximately 3,800 ocean engineers, technologists, policy-makers, and educators. The goal of the society, which was founded in 1963, is to promote awareness, understanding, advancement and application of marine technology. The association is based in Washington, District of Columbia, United States. Former executive directors include Martin Finnerty, Judith T. Krauthamer and Richard Lawson.

The society consists of 29 technical disciplines and presently has 17 sections, including overseas sections in Japan, Korea and Norway. In addition, MTS has 23 student sections at colleges and universities with related fields of study.

The flagship publication of the society is the MTS Journal. The journal is published 6 times annually and primarily features themed issues consisting of invited papers. The journal has a current ISI Impact Factor of .763

MTS sponsors several conferences of note, including the OCEANS Conference (co-sponsosed with IEEE/OES), Underwater Intervention (co-sponsored with ADCI), Dynamic Positioning Conference, biennial Buoy Workshop (co-sponsored with the Office of Naval Research), and the hot-topic workshop series TechSurge.

In 1969 the group held its annual convention in Miami Beach. The convention was addressed by Spiro Agnew, who was then Vice President of the United States.

In 1993 the laser line scan, a U.S. Navy photography secret, made its debut at the society sponsored trade show in New Orleans.

References

External links 
 

Engineering societies based in the United States
Marine engineering organizations
Organizations based in Maryland
Oceanography